Gadebuscher Bach is a river of Mecklenburg-Vorpommern, Germany. Its source is east of the town Gadebusch, and it flows into the Stepenitz near Brüsewitz.

See also
List of rivers of Mecklenburg-Vorpommern

Rivers of Mecklenburg-Western Pomerania
Rivers of Germany